Amesiella philippinensis is a species of orchid endemic to the Island of Luzon in the Philippines. Like Vanda falcata it was mistaken as an Angraecum species, due to the white, long-spurred flowers. The plant produces rounded leaces up to 5 cm in length. Three or four white, fragrant flowers of 3 cm in width are produced on short inflorescences. The labellum is yellow in the throat. It occurs at lower altitudes than Amesiella monticola and has a shorter spur.

References

External links
IOSPE orchid photos Amesiella philippinensis
Orchidiana Amesiella philippinensis
Orchid Taiwan, 菲律賓風蘭, Amesiella philippinensis 
Picsearch Amesiella pictures
Планета Орхидей Амезиелла филипинская Amesiella philippinensis

philippinensis
Endemic orchids of the Philippines
Endangered flora of Asia